Scott Waites (born 17 February 1977) is an English professional darts player who plays in tournaments of the Professional Darts Corporation (PDC). He is a two-time BDO World Darts Champion having won the 2013 tournament and 2016 tournament. He is also a former Winmau World Masters champion, WDF World Cup singles' champion, Zuiderduin Masters champion. He also won the 2010 Grand Slam of Darts, becoming the only BDO representative to win the event.

Career
Waites' first career success came in February 2007 when he won the Dutch Open an event which attracted 2867 entries. He also took the Welsh Masters title in March 2007 and earlier reached the final of the 2007 Scottish Open.

Barry Hearn confirmed on 13 August 2007 via the official PDC website, that Scott Waites was the highest ranked non-qualifier in the BDO that had accepted his invitation to compete in the inaugural Grand Slam of Darts, alongside Dennis Priestley (highest PDC non-qualifier). At the tournament he failed to qualify for the knockout stage, losing all three group matches to Michael van Gerwen, Mervyn King and Roland Scholten.

He made his World Championship debut at the 2008 BDO World Darts Championship and reached the quarter-finals, defeating Mike Veitch and Remco van Eijden before losing to Brian Woods.

Waites was one of 32 pub qualifiers for the 2008 PDC UK Open, reaching to the last 32 stage, losing to Ronnie Baxter.

On 12 July 2008 Waites won the 2008 BDO Gold Cup, beating Gary Anderson four sets to two in the final. In December 2008, Waites reached his first major BDO final, reaching the Winmau World Masters final. He was beaten 7–6 by Martin Adams, but ended the year ranked #1 on the WDF rankings due to his consistent season.

Through his performances at the World Masters, the World Championship and also the Zuiderduin Masters, Waites became the number one ranked player on the BDO world rankings. Waites reached the quarter finals of the 2009 BDO World Championship, losing to Darryl Fitton 5–4 having led 4–2.

He entered the 2009 Winmau World Masters as the number two seed, but lost in the last 16 stage in a major upset to Lourence Ilagan of the Philippines having had several darts to win the match.

Waites reached the final of the 2009 Grand Slam of Darts, a PDC major held at Wolverhampton Civic Centre, where he was beaten 16–2 by PDC world number one Phil Taylor. This earned Waites £50,000, which was at the time his biggest success in the game.

For some of his matches he has used Chelsea Dagger by The Fratellis as his entrance music. However at the 2009 Grand Slam of Darts, Waites used Walk This Way by Run-D.M.C., to avoid a clash with Chelsea Dagger,  the music played during breaks.

Waites entered the 2010 BDO World Championship as the 2nd seed. For the third consecutive year, he was knocked out at the quarter final stage, this time by Martin Phillips of Wales. Waites had recovered from 4–0 down to level at 4–4 before Phillips prevailed.

At the 2010 World Masters, Waites reached the Quarter Finals, before losing to eventual champion Martin Adams.

At the 2010 Grand Slam of Darts, Waites once again reached the final by winning all three of his group matches, then following up with comprehensive victories over Raymond van Barneveld, Co Stompé and Steve Beaton (who had earlier eliminated Taylor). Waites played James Wade in the final, and defeated the PDC world #2 16–12 having trailed 8–0. The win was Watites's first in either a PDC or a BDO major, and made him the first player from the BDO (and the first player from either code other than Phil Taylor) to win the Grand Slam.

Waites was the sixth seed for the 2011 BDO World Championship and was second favourite with bookmakers at the start of the tournament. In the first round he defeated the unseeded two-time champion Ted Hankey 3–0, but in the second round he lost 4–2 to another unseeded player, Stephen Bunting.

At the 2011 World Masters in Hull, Waites defeated Ewan Hyslop in the Last 16, Gary Robson in the Quarter-Finals, defending champion Martin Adams in the semi-finals, and World Championship runner-up Dean Winstanley in the final to win his first World Masters title.

Waites continued his impressive run of form by winning the BDO British Open beating Willy van de Wiel 3–1 and WDF World Cup beating Martin Adams 6–2. He then won his third major championship at the Zuiderduin Masters, beating former champion Darryl Fitton 5–4 in the final after Fitton missed darts to win. However, Waites was beaten in the second round at the 2012 BDO World Championship 4–3 by Ted Hankey.

At the 2012 Grand Slam of Darts, Waites topped his group by beating Phil Taylor 5–2, avenging his heavy loss to the same player in the 2009 final. He was eliminated in the quarter-finals by Michael van Gerwen 16–12.

Waites went into the 2013 BDO World Championship as number three seed and bookmakers' favourite. He beat Willy van de Wiel 3–0 in the first round, Geert De Vos 4–1 in the second round, and Paul Jennings 5–2 in the quarter-final to reach the semi-finals for the first time. He then beat Richie George 6–1 to set up a final against two-time runner-up Tony O'Shea, which Waites won 7–1 to win the title.

Waites had a lower-profile season in 2013–14, suffering early exits in the Winmau Masters and Zuiderduin Masters and not being selected to defend his WDF World Cup singles title. He did enjoy another good run at the PDC Grand Slam, reaching the semi-finals before being defeated by Robert Thornton. However, his season ended in disappointment when, as the defending champion, he was eliminated in the first round of the 2014 BDO World Darts Championship 3–0 by eventual runner-up Alan Norris. It was the first time Waites had lost in the first round of the world championship, and afterwards he complained of a lack of preparation due to injuries as well as a power-cut shortly before his match started, though he still gave credit to Norris for his performance.

Waites's indifferent form continued at the start of the 2014–15 season when he lost in the first round of the World Trophy to Jim Williams.

At the 2015 World Championship, Waites opened his campaign with a 3–2 win over Sam Hewson, to set up a second-round tie with Ross Montgomery, which he lost 4–0.

Waites pulled out of the 2015 World Trophy due to having an operation on his shoulder; this put him out of action for a couple of months. He returned in March, and won the British Classic defeating Glen Durrant in the final. He also reached a further 4 finals.

Entering the 2016 World Championship as the 9th seed, Waites won his second World Championship by beating Canada's Jeff Smith 7–1 in the final.

PDC

It was announced after his first round victory at the 2019 BDO World Darts Championship that he would be heading to PDC Q School after the Lakeside tournament and could finally make the switch to the other side of the sport, if all went to plan in Wigan. However, Waites failed to earn a tour card in the four day qualifying event and subsequently remained in the BDO. He entered the following weekend's PDC Challenge Tour events. Once again he competed for a tour card at the 2020 Q School to join the Professional Darts Corporation. This time he was successful, beating Keane Barry 5–0 in a play-off match on the final day to earn a two-year PDC Tour Card.

In his World Championship debut in 2021 he beat Matt Campbell 3–2 in the first round, before losing to Nathan Aspinall by the same score in the second, despite having 4 match darts.

Personal life
Waites was born in Bradford, West Yorkshire. He currently resides in Huddersfield, West Yorkshire. He has a stepson, Michael, with his ex-partner.

Waites was not a  full-time professional player during his time on the BDO circuit, he was at the time a carpenter for Pennine Housing 2000, a member of the Together Housing Group who also acted as a sponsor. Waites quit his job in 2020 after successfully gaining a 2-year PDC tour card at Q School and is now a full time professional dart player in the PDC.

Waites supports Liverpool F.C.

World Championship performances

BDO

PDC
 2021: 2nd round (lost to Nathan Aspinall 2–3)

Career finals

BDO major finals: 7 (4 titles, 3 runners-up)

WDF major finals: 1 (1 title)

PDC premier event finals: 2 (1 title, 1 runner-up)

Performance timeline

PDC European Tour

High averages

References

External links

1977 births
Sportspeople from Bradford
English darts players
Living people
British Darts Organisation players
BDO world darts champions
Grand Slam of Darts champions
Professional Darts Corporation current tour card holders